Archery at the 1996 Summer Paralympics consisted of eight events.

Medal table

Participating nations

Medal summary

See also 
Archery at the 1996 Summer Olympics

References 

 

 
1996 Summer Paralympics events
1996